is a Japanese artist specializing in modern moku hanga woodblock prints. He turned to the medium in 1959, about two years after his graduation from Ibaraki University. He has since had numerous exhibitions in Japan, the U.S., and Australia. In 1978-79, the Japanese Ministry of Culture sent him to the U.S. as a delegate artist.

References
Tomihari, Hiroshi, Hiroshi Tomihari: Catalogue, 1975-1977 (San Francisco: Soker-Kaseman Gallery, 1977)
Tomihari, Hiroshi, Tomihari Hiroshi mokuhangashū [Hiroshi Tomihari woodcut prints], 1960-1981, (Tokyo: Abe Shuppan, 1982)
Tomihari, Hiroshi, ザ・木版画： 富張広司の世界1960－2004. [Za mokuhanga : tomihari hiroshi no sekai Senkyūhyakurokujū nisen yon] (Ibarakishinbunsha [茨城新聞社], 2004) 
"Woodblock prints by Hiroshi Tomihari: Ronin Gallery," Arts of Asia 9 (May 1979): 140.
Merritt, Helen and Yamada, Nanako, Modern Japanese Woodblock Prints 1900-1975, (Honolulu: University of Hawaii Press, 1995)

External links
 Official website

1936 births
Living people
Japanese printmakers
People from Ibaraki Prefecture
Ibaraki University alumni